Michael Cottam may refer to:
 Michael Cottam (born 1966), an English cricketer
 Michael Gordon Cottam (born 1945), an English–Canadian physicist

See also 
 Asteroid 273262 Cottam, named after the physicist